Kumo is a public art work by artist Isaac Witkin located at the Lynden Sculpture Garden near Milwaukee, Wisconsin. The sculpture is an abstract form made of Corten steel curved shapes; it is installed on the lawn.

References

1970 sculptures
Outdoor sculptures in Wisconsin
Steel sculptures in Wisconsin